Yasutaka Hattori (服部 泰卓, born September 10, 1982 in Mima, Tokushima) is a former Japanese professional baseball pitcher. He played with the Chiba Lotte Marines from 2010 to 2011 and from 2013 to 2014.

External links

NPB

1982 births
Living people
Asian Games medalists in baseball
Asian Games silver medalists for Japan
Baseball players at the 2006 Asian Games
Chiba Lotte Marines players
Japanese expatriate baseball players in the United States
North Shore Honu players
Komazawa University alumni
Medalists at the 2006 Asian Games
Nippon Professional Baseball pitchers
Baseball people from Tokushima Prefecture